Princess Latifa may refer to:

 Latifa Al Maktoum (disambiguation), the name of several members of the royal house of Dubai
 Latifa bint Abdulaziz Al Saud, member of the House of Saud

See also
 Queen Latifah (born 1970), American musician and actress